Merismatium is a genus of lichenicolous (lichen-dwelling) fungi of uncertain familial placement in the order Verrucariales. The genus was circumscribed in 1898 by Friedrich Wilhelm Zopf.

Species
, Species Fungorum (in the Catalogue of Life) accepts six species of Merismatium. Host information is from Diederich et al. (2018).
 Merismatium coccotremicola  – host: Coccotrema
 Merismatium corae  – host: Cora
 Merismatium deminutum  – hosts: Polyblastia, Staurothele, Thelidium, Verrucaria
 Merismatium nigritellum  – hosts: Catapyrenium, Leptogium, Lichenomphalia, Lopadium, Micarea, Mycobilimbia, Ochrolechia, Protoblastenia
 Merismatium peregrinum  – host: Rimularia
 Merismatium thamnoliicola  – host: Thamnolia

References

Verrucariales
Eurotiomycetes genera
Taxa named by Friedrich Wilhelm Zopf
Taxa described in 1898
Lichenicolous fungi